, son of Kanetsugu, was a kugyō or Japanese court noble of the Muromachi period (1336–1573). He held a regent position kampaku from 1408 to 1409. With a commoner he had a son Fusatsugu.

References

Fujiwara clan
Konoe family
1383 births
1454 deaths